Charles William Ramsdell (April 4, 1877 – July 3, 1942) was an American historian.

Early life
Charles William Ramsdell was born on April 4, 1877, in Salado, Texas. His father, Charles H. Ramsdell, arrived in Texas from New England just before the Civil War. He enlisted as a private for the Confederate States of America. Charles H. worked as a merchant and as a cotton farmer. His mother was Fredonia (Halley) Ramsdell, who bore, four sons and two daughters.

During Reconstruction, prior to Ramsdell's birth, Bell County, Texas, was the location of anti-Unionist violence. Union troops were called in to enforce the peace, and Hiram Christian, a federal judge, administered Reconstruction law in the area. By 1870, however, anti-Unionists drove the Reconstruction officials out of Bell County. Ramsdell grew up in an area that persisted in anti-Union sentiment.

Ramsdell attended public schools, but completed his secondary education at Thomas Arnold High School, a private institution in Salado.

Career
Ramsdell was a school teacher in the Houston area around 1900.

Ramsdell enrolled at the University of Texas in 1900. In addition to embarking on a "classical curriculum," he was a star on the university's football team, and served as the team's captain for his final season. At a time when college football players were often hard-drinking denizens of the university nightlife, he promoted the example of the student-athlete, according to historian Joe B. Frantz. Ramsdell was the senior class president. He earned a B.A. and M.A. in 1903 and 1904, respectively, and completed his doctorate at Columbia University in 1910. Among his influences as an undergraduate were Professor Lester G, Bugbee and his classmates, Eugene Campbell Barker and Herbert Eugene Bolden.

Ramsdell was a professor of history at the University of Texas, and served on the executive committee of the Texas State Historical Association, 1907–1942. His research centered on the history of the Old South from 1800 to the close of the Reconstruction Era. While at Columbia, he was a student of William Dunning and remained an adherent of the Dunning School throughout his career.

Death
Ramsdell died on July 3, 1942.

Citations

References

External links
 

1877 births
1942 deaths
University of Texas at Austin faculty
20th-century American historians
20th-century American male writers
Historians of the Southern United States
American male non-fiction writers
University of Texas alumni
American editors
Columbia University alumni
Dunning School